James Estabrook (September 4, 1796 – May 16, 1874) was a Worcester, Massachusetts grocer who served as the sheriff of Worcester County, Massachusetts from 1851 to 1853.

Early life
Estabrook was born to James and Betsey (Lovell) Estabrook in Holden, Massachusetts, on September 4, 1796.

References

19th-century American people
1796 births
1874 deaths
Businesspeople from Boston
People from Holden, Massachusetts
People from Boston
People from Worcester, Massachusetts
Massachusetts Democrats
Sheriffs of Worcester County, Massachusetts
Massachusetts city council members
19th-century American politicians
19th-century American businesspeople